Berlin Short Film Festival is a film festival with a special emphasis on independent short films, which annually takes place in Berlin, Germany. It screens German and international short films with a runtime under 50 minutes and awards them in various categories.

About 

The festival was founded in 2014 and takes place at historic Babylon cinema in Berlin The selection of the festival is international, and it awards films in eight categories. Many international filmmakers attend the event, and foreign language films are usually screened with English subtitles due to the international audience.

Winners

2019 

Best Short Film: Coming Up For Air (Director: Jeroen Hoogaars)
Best Short Documentary: Interior Motives (Director: Natalie Shirinian)
Best Short Short Film: Dance of the Dead (Director: Scarlet Sykes Hesterman)
Best Sci-Fi Short Film: Full Circle (Director: Willem van Egmond)
Best Horror Short Film: #YouToo (Directors: Björn Pinxten, Jenne Decleir)
Best Experimental Short Film: Artistes Burlesques (Director: John Bickerton)
Best Comedy Short Film: Guilty Pleasure (Directors: Yannik Leibacher, René Müller)
Best LGBT Short Film: With Reason and With Heart (Director: Inge Theunissen)
Best Animated Short Film: Two Balloons (Director: Mark C. Smith)
Best Short Feature: 1969–2019 (Director: Ira Schneider)
Best Music Video: Midnight Dancer (Director: Dan Przygoda)

2018 

Best Short Film: Bournonville Today (Director: Signe Roderik)
Best Short Documentary: Vanishing History (Director: Daud Khattak)
Best Short Short Film: Fortnite: Gasoline, Official Video (Directors: Sven D., Philipp Primus)
Best Sci-Fi Short Film: Saturn Voyager (Directors: Iuri Araújo, Guilherme Araújo)
Best Horror Short Film: Quiver (Director: Shayna Connelly)
Best Experimental Short Film: War For Lizards (Director: Farshad Bagheri)
Best Comedy Short Film: State Of Emergency (Director: Tarek Roehlinger)
Best LGBT Short Film: MMF (Director: Leonard Garner)
Best Animated Short Film: Tall Juan: Cuidacoches (Director: Dante Zaballa)
Best Short Feature: The Peculiar Abilities Of Mr Mahler (Director: Paul Philipp)
Best Music Video: Metamorphosen (Director: Katharina Ziemkus)

2017 

Best Short Film: Southern Edge of The Cloud (Director: Ching Yan Alon Chan)
Best Short Documentary: The Voice of a Million Times One (Director: Marijn Poels)
Best Short Short Film: Breakfast of Champions (Director: Beraat Gökkuş)
Best Sci-Fi Short Film: A Magician (Director: Max Blustin)
Best Horror Short Film: The Black Bull Incident, Episode One: Pretty Rough Around Closing (Directors: Rob Wright, Si Wright)
Best Experimental Short Film: The Charlotte Russe with the Medal of the Wobbling Bubble in its Palm Trilogy (Director: Ira Schneider)
Best Comedy Short Film: The Cowboy (Director: Jack Hansen)
Best Music Video: Stop Us (Director: This is Felo)

2016 

Best Short Film: Nothing Escapes My Eyes (Director: David Krippendorff)
Best Short Documentary: Born of Stone (Director: Emilio Bellu)
Best Short Short Film: The Peacock (Director: Wenquian Gao)
Best Sci-Fi Short Film: The Last Journey of the Enigmatic Paul WR (Director: Romain Quirot)
Best Horror Short Film: How To Be A Villain (Director: Helen O'Hanlon)
Best Experimental Short Film: Artistic Dictatorship (Director: Gor Aroevic)
Best Comedy Short Film: Tre Tosser (Three Fools) (Directors: Snobar Avani, Peter Hausner)
Best Music Video: Lamentation (Director: Kirk Kelley)

2015 

Best Short Film: Endangered Species (Director: Ira Schneider)
Best Short Documentary: Above & Below: Galapagos National Park (Directors: Florian Fischer, Michael Kugler)
Best Short Short Film: Clairvoyance (Director: Hiroki Yokoyama)
Best Sci-Fi Short Film: The Long Slow Flight of the Ashbot (Director: Colin West McDonald)
Best Horror Short Film: The Graveyard Shift (Director: Peter Feysa)
Best Experimental Short Film: conform! (Directors: Alexander Bobenko, Charles Gunn)
Best Comedy Short Film: The Critic (Director: Alexander Tuschinski)
Best Music Video: IceTruckFuckHardcore (Directors: Johannes Lohmann, Christoph Hertel)

2014 

Best Short Film: Too Bad (Director: Lorenzo Berghella)
Best German Short Film: Roughtown (Director: Gabriele Heberling)
Best Short Documentary: Shakespeare’s Intermission (Director: Diana Nilles)
Best Sci-Fi/Horror Short Film: O (Director: July Allard)
Best Experimental Short Film: Frollein Frappe (Director: Vanessa Aab)
Best Short Short Film: Interior (Director: Immanuel Esser)
Best Music Video: Seduction (Director: Parker Ellerman)

Reception

References

External links

 IMDB: Page of the festival
  Official Facebook-Site of the festival.

Film festivals in Berlin
Annual events in Berlin

2014 establishments in Germany
Film festivals established in 2014